Malayath Appunni (born 15 August 1943) is a Malayalam language poet and children's writer from Kerala, India. Born in Thekken Kuttoor in Tirur, Malappuram district, Appunni writes simple poetry. He has won the Kerala Sahitya Akademi Award.

Works

Poems 
 Aravu Madukal
 Thekkottulla Theevandi
 Karthika Nakshatram
 Nhaval Pazhangal
 Puzhakkarayil
 Pachilayude Chiri

Children's literature 
 Kazhcha Bungalow 
 Nirangal
 Thenthullikal
 Velicham
 Panchara Mittayi
 Panchavarnakkilikal
 Kunhikkuttanum Koottukaranum
 Kunhan Kurukkan
 Kittuppanikker

Awards
 Kendra Sahitya Akademi Award for Children's Literature (2019) for overall contributions.
 Award by Kerala State Institute for Children's Literature (1997) for Thenthullikal
 Kerala Sahitya Akademi Award (Children's Literature) (1998) for Kambilikuppayam
 Kerala Sahitya Akademi Award for his overall contributions to Malayalam literature (2010)
 Krishna Geethi Poetry Prize (2010) for Pachilayude Chiri
 Moodadi Award
 Akshara Kalari Award

References

1943 births
People from Malappuram
Malayali people
Indian male poets
Indian children's writers
Malayalam-language writers
Malayalam poets
Recipients of the Kerala Sahitya Akademi Award
Living people
Poets from Kerala
20th-century Indian poets
20th-century Indian novelists
Novelists from Kerala
20th-century Indian male writers